Svilen Marinov Simeonov (born 8 October 1974) is a former Bulgarian football player, who played as a goalkeeper.

References

1974 births
Living people
Bulgarian footballers
PFC Dobrudzha Dobrich players
Neftochimic Burgas players
PFC Spartak Varna players
PFC Nesebar players
First Professional Football League (Bulgaria) players
Expatriate footballers in Azerbaijan

Association football goalkeepers
Bulgarian expatriate sportspeople in Azerbaijan
People from Dobrich